"Everything's Alright" is a song written by John D. Loudermilk and performed by The Newbeats.  It reached #6 in Canada, #16 on the Billboard Hot 100, and #53 in Australia in 1964.  The song was also released in the United Kingdom as a single, but it did not chart.  The song was featured on their 1964 album, Bread & Butter.

The song was re-released as the B-side to the group's 1972 single, "Love Gets Sweeter".

References

1964 songs
1964 singles
Songs written by John D. Loudermilk
The Newbeats songs